Juan Pardo de Tavera (1472–1545) was a cardinal (from 1531) and was Archbishop of Toledo and Primate of Spain (1534–1545), Grand Inquisitor of Spain (1539–1545), Archbishop of Santiago de Compostela (1524–1534), Bishop of Osma (1523–1524), and Bishop of Ciudad Rodrigo (1514–1523).

Biography

Juan Pardo de Tavera was born in Toro, Zamora on 16 May 1472, the son of Ares Pardo and Guiomar Tavera. On his mother's side, he was the nephew of Diego Deza, who would serve as his patron and mentor. He studied at the University of Salamanca, receiving a bachelor's degree in 1500 and a Licentiate of Canon Law in 1505. He became the rector of the university in 1505.

His uncle named him a member of the cathedral chapter of Seville Cathedral in 1505. Ferdinand II of Aragon named him auditor of the Spanish Inquisition in 1506. He was elected Bishop of Ciudad Rodrigo on 14 July 1514 and consecrated as a bishop later that year. Cardinal Adrian of Utrecht appointed him as a diplomat to negotiate the marriage of Charles I of Spain to Isabella of Portugal, and of John III of Portugal with Catherine of Castile. He was translated to the see of Osma on 31 December 1523. He was promoted to Archbishop of Santiago de Compostela on 8 June 1524. He became president of the royal council in 1524 and held that office for the next fifteen years. He presided over the Cortes Generales held in Toledo (1525), Valladolid (1527), Madrid (1528), Valladolid (1537), and Toledo (1538).

Pope Clement VII made Juan Pardo de Tavera a cardinal priest at the consistory of 22 February 1531. He subsequently received the red hat and the title of San Giovanni a Porta Latina at the consistory of 27 April 1531.

He was transferred to the see of Toledo on 27 April 1534, thus becoming Primate of Spain.

Following the death of Isabella of Portugal on 1 May 1539, Charles V appointed Juan Pardo de Tavera regent of Castile in his absence, a post he would hold until 1541. At the same time, he was appointed Grand Inquisitor of Spain on 10 June 1539 and he began his duties as Grand Inquisitor on 7 December 1539.

He died in Valladolid on 1 August 1545. He was buried in the Hospital de San Juan Bautista de Toledo, in a marble tomb designed by Alonso Berruguete. While Bishop, he was the principal consecrator of Esteban Almeida, Bishop of Astorga (1540); Durante Duranti, Bishop of Alghero (1540); Antoine Perrenot de Granvella, Bishop of Arras (1542); St. Tomás Garcia Martinez (de Villanueva), Archbishop of Valencia in Spain (1544); and Juan Bernal Díaz de Luco, Bishop of Calahorra y La Calzada (1545).

References

External links
Biography (Ducal House of Medinaceli Foundation) 
Hospital de San Juan Bautista: Through its history (Ducal House of Medinaceli Foundation)

1472 births
1545 deaths
Burials in the Province of Toledo
People from the Province of Zamora
Archbishops of Toledo
Bishops of Ciudad Rodrigo
Grand Inquisitors of Spain
16th-century Roman Catholic archbishops in Spain
University of Salamanca alumni
Academic staff of the University of Salamanca